SR144528 is a drug that acts as a potent and highly selective CB2 receptor inverse agonist, with a Ki of 0.6 nM at CB2 and 400 nM at the related CB1 receptor. It is used in scientific research for investigating the function of the CB2 receptor, as well as for studying the effects of CB1 receptors in isolation, as few CB1 agonists that do not also show significant activity as CB2 agonists are available. It has also been found to be an inhibitor of sterol O-acyltransferase, an effect that appears to be independent from its action on CB2 receptors.

See also 
 NESS-040C5
 Rimonabant
 MN-25

References 

Cannabinoids
Chloroarenes
Pyrazolecarboxamides